Astatine compounds are compounds that contain the element astatine (At). As this element is very radioactive, few compounds have been studied. Less reactive than iodine, astatine is the least reactive of the halogens. Its compounds have been synthesized in nano-scale amounts and studied as intensively as possible before their radioactive disintegration. The reactions involved have been typically tested with dilute solutions of astatine mixed with larger amounts of iodine. Acting as a carrier, the iodine ensures there is sufficient material for laboratory techniques (such as filtration and precipitation) to work. Like iodine, astatine has been shown to adopt odd-numbered oxidation states ranging from −1 to +7.

Only a few compounds with metals have been reported, in the form of astatides of sodium, palladium, silver, thallium, and lead. Some characteristic properties of silver and sodium astatide, and the other hypothetical alkali and alkaline earth astatides, have been estimated by extrapolation from other metal halides.

The formation of an astatine compound with hydrogen – usually referred to as hydrogen astatide – was noted by the pioneers of astatine chemistry. As mentioned, there are grounds for instead referring to this compound as astatine hydride. It is easily oxidized; acidification by dilute nitric acid gives the At0 or At+ forms, and the subsequent addition of silver(I) may only partially, at best, precipitate astatine as silver(I) astatide (AgAt). Iodine, in contrast, is not oxidized, and precipitates readily as silver(I) iodide.

Astatine is known to bind to boron, carbon, and nitrogen. Various boron cage compounds have been prepared with At–B bonds, these being more stable than At–C bonds. Astatine can replace a hydrogen atom in benzene to form astatobenzene C6H5At; this may be oxidized to C6H5AtCl2 by chlorine. By treating this compound with an alkaline solution of hypochlorite, C6H5AtO2 can be produced. The dipyridine-astatine(I) cation, [At(C5H5N)2]+, forms ionic compounds with perchlorate (a non-coordinating anion) and with nitrate, [At(C5H5N)2]NO3. This cation exists as a coordination complex in which two dative covalent bonds separately link the astatine(I) centre with each of the pyridine rings via their nitrogen atoms.

With oxygen, there is evidence of the species AtO− and AtO+ in aqueous solution, formed by the reaction of astatine with an oxidant such as elemental bromine or (in the last case) by sodium persulfate in a solution of perchloric acid: the latter species might also be protonated astatous acid, . The species previously thought to be  has since been determined to be , a hydrolysis product of AtO+ (another such hydrolysis product being AtOOH). The well characterized  anion can be obtained by, for example, the oxidation of astatine with potassium hypochlorite in a solution of potassium hydroxide. Preparation of lanthanum triastatate La(AtO3)3, following the oxidation of astatine by a hot Na2S2O8 solution, has been reported. Astatine is also thought to be capable of forming cations in salts with oxyanions such as iodate or dichromate; this is based on the observation that, in acidic solutions, monovalent or intermediate positive states of astatine coprecipitate with the insoluble salts of metal cations such as silver(I) iodate or thallium(I) dichromate.

Astatine is known to react with its lighter homologs iodine, bromine, and chlorine in the vapor state; these reactions produce diatomic interhalogen compounds with formulas AtI, AtBr, and AtCl. The first two compounds may also be produced in water – astatine reacts with iodine/iodide solution to form AtI, whereas AtBr requires (aside from astatine) an iodine/iodine monobromide/bromide solution. Oxidation of the element with dichromate (in nitric acid solution) showed that adding chloride turned the astatine into a molecule likely to be either AtCl or AtOCl. Similarly,  or  may be produced. The polyhalides PdAtI2, CsAtI2, TlAtI2, and PbAtI are known or presumed to have been precipitated. In a plasma ion source mass spectrometer, the ions [AtI]+, [AtBr]+, and [AtCl]+ have been formed by introducing lighter halogen vapors into a helium-filled cell containing astatine, supporting the existence of stable neutral molecules in the plasma ion state. No astatine fluorides have been discovered yet. Their absence has been speculatively attributed to the extreme reactivity of such compounds, including the reaction of an initially formed fluoride with the walls of the glass container to form a non-volatile product. Thus, although the synthesis of an astatine fluoride is thought to be possible, it may require a liquid halogen fluoride solvent, as has already been used for the characterization of radon fluoride.

Notes

References

Works cited
 
 
 
 

Astatine compounds
Astatine
Chemical compounds by element